The Shaiva Upanishads are minor Upanishads of Hinduism, specific to Shiva theology (Shaivism). There are 14 Shaiva Upanishads in the Muktika anthology of 108 Upanishads. They, along with other minor Upanishads, are generally classified separate from the thirteen ancient Principal Upanishads rooted in the Vedic tradition.

The Shaiva Upanishads also contrast from other groups of minor Upanishads, such as the Samanya Upanishads which are of a generic nature, the Sannyasa Upanishads which focus on the Hindu renunciation and monastic practice, the Yoga Upanishads related to Yoga, the Vaishnava Upanishads which highlight aspects of Vishnu, and the Shakta Upanishads which highlight Shaktism.

The Shaiva Upanishads extol Shiva as the metaphysical Brahman and the Atman (soul, self). A few texts such as Atharvashiras Upanishad include alternate terms such as Rudra, and assert all gods are Rudra, everyone and everything is Rudra, and Rudra is the principle found in all things, their highest goal, the innermost essence of all reality that is visible or invisible. Some Shaiva Upanishads include sections with symbolism about costumes, rites and objects of worship in Shaivism.

Date
The Shaiva Upanishads and other minor Upanishads are a separate subgroup from the thirteen major Principal Upanishads considered to be more ancient dated to be between eighth and first century BCE; however, the estimates for the minor Upanishads vary. According to Mahony, the minor Upanishads are approximately dated to be from about 100 BC to 1100 AD. Patrick Olivelle states that sectarian Upanishads attached to Atharvaveda were likely composed in the second millennium, until about the 16th century.

One of the thirteen Principal Upanishads, namely the Shvetashvatara Upanishad mentions Shiva, Rudra, Hara and other Vedic deities, as well as Samkhya-Yoga and Vedanta philosophy. Shvetashvatara is neither considered a Shaiva nor a minor Upanishad.

The Nilarudra Upanishad is an important Shiva-focussed Upanishad, remarks Deussen, from the group of five minor Upanishads which assert god Shiva as a symbolism for Atman (soul). These are ancient Hindu texts, with Nilarudra likely the oldest (composed closer to Shvetashvatara Upanishad), but Nilaruda is not included in the anthology of 108 Upanishads by Muktika like the other four of the five.

List of 14 Shaiva Upanishads

See also
Hindu texts
Vedas

References

Bibliography

Upanishads